The All-Ireland Senior Hurling Championship 1911 was the 25th series of the All-Ireland Senior Hurling Championship, Ireland's premier hurling knock-out competition.  Kilkenny won the championship, beating Tipperary 3-3 to 2-1 in a substitute final.

Format

All-Ireland Championship

Semi-finals: (2 matches) The four provincial representatives made up the semi-final pairings.  Two teams are eliminated at this stage while the two winning teams advance to the All-Ireland final.

Final: (1 match) The winners of the two semi-finals contest this game with the winners being declared All-Ireland champions.

Results

Connacht Senior Hurling Championship

Leinster Senior Hurling Championship

Munster Senior Hurling Championship

All-Ireland Senior Hurling Championship

Championship statistics

Results

 The All-Ireland final between Kilkenny and Limerick is never played.  The original fixture was cancelled due to the state of the pitch at the Cork Athletic Grounds.  The final was postponed until the 12 May, however, Limerick refused to play in that game.  A substitute contest took place at Fraher Field on 28 July.  The Munster Council nominated Tipperary to play Kilkenny, with the latter winning the game by 3-3 to 2-1.

References

Sources
 Corry, Eoghan, The GAA Book of Lists (Hodder Headline Ireland, 2005).
 Donegan, Des, The Complete Handbook of Gaelic Games (DBA Publications Limited, 2005).

See also

1911
All-Ireland Senior Hurling Championship